The following is a list of characters that first appeared in the British soap opera Emmerdale Farm in 1974, by order of first appearance. Jim Gimbel (John Atkinson) makes his debut appearance in November.

Jim Gimbel

Jim Gimbel, played by John Atkinson, first appears on 25 November 1974. Prior to his onscreen debut, he is mentioned by Amos Brearly (Ronald Magill) and Sam Pearson (Toke Townley). In October 1974, after Joe Sugden (Frazer Hines) and his wife Christine (Angela Cheyne) separate after six weeks of marriage, Joe begins dating Jim's daughter, Kathy (Polly Hemingway), which Jim disapproves of. Jim throws his son Martin (George Fenton) out after an argument with him, but later allows back home. Jim feels he was being patronised by his son about how to do farming. Jim and his wife Freda (Mary Henry) go to visit Jim's sister. Offscreen, Jim becomes increasingly violent. He starts physically abusing his children, and when he raises his hand to Freda, Freda leaves Jim. A depressed Jim then shoots himself.

1974
, Emmerdale